The Samyang T-S 24mm 1:3.5 ED AS UMC is an interchangeable wide angle tilt-shift lens for cameras with a full frame or smaller sensor. It was announced by Samyang on September 7, 2012.

References

External links

Perspective-control lenses
Camera lenses introduced in 2012
024